The 1971 World 600, the 12th running of the event, was a NASCAR Winston Cup Series racing event that took place on May 30, 1971, at Charlotte Motor Speedway in Concord, North Carolina. It marked the return of Chevrolet to NASCAR. 

Chevrolet would go on to dominate NASCAR during the subsequent decades.

Qualifying

Summary
There were 40 drivers in this 400-lap race; Walter Ballard received the last place finish due to a crash on the eleventh lap. The race took more than four hours to complete. There were 13 lead changes and three caution period for 24 laps. Charlotte Motor Speedway had just gone bankrupt a year earlier and the district judge assigned ownership of the floundering track to Mr. Richard Howard; who owned a furniture store in the area. He came up with the idea of having two pace cars advertise his furniture at this race and at the 1971 National 500. As a result, the speedway managed to recover and it still hosts Cup Series races to this day.

Bobby Allison defeated Donnie Allison by 34 seconds in front of an audience of 78000; starting the first of five consecutive wins for Bobby Allison. The other finishers in the top ten were: Pete Hamilton, Richard Petty, Fred Lorenzen, Buddy Baker, Benny Parsons, Friday Hassler (the fastest Chevrolet driver), Dave Marcis and Dick Brooks.

Notable crew chiefs for the race were Paul Goldsmith, Junie Donlavey, Harry Hyde, Dale Inman, Tom Vandiver, and Lee Gordon.

Speedy Thompson made his last start of his NASCAR Cup Series career and would finish in 16th place despite being absent from the NASCAR Winston Cup Series for nearly nine years. Larry Smith would begin his tragically short NASCAR career during this race; resulting in a 22nd-place finish. One of the most eagerly anticipated races ever as it marked the first competitive entry of a Junior Johnson-owned Chevy. Chevrolet had gone several years without a win in the Grand National division and nearly ended that dry spell in this race. Glotzbach was running strong when he tangled with the lapped car of Thompson and crashed on lap 234, ending his day.

Kevin Terris tried to qualify for this race in a Plymouth Road Runner,  but he failed to qualify.

Timeline
Section reference: 
 Start of race: Bobby Allison emerged the ahead of the pack as the green flag was waved.
 Lap 6: Charlie Glotzbach took over the lead from Bobby Allison.
 Lap 11: Walter Ballard had a terminal crash.
 Lap 17: Dave Marcis took over the lead from Charlie Glotzbach, Charlie Roberts' engine stopped working.
 Lap 24: James Hylton took over the lead from Dave Marcis.
 Lap 25: Bobby Allison took over the lead from James Hylton.
 Lap 60: G.C. Spencer's engine stopped working.
 Lap 77: Buddy Baker took over the lead from Bobby Allison.
 Lap 79: Bobby Allison took over the lead from Buddy Baker.
 Lap 92: Charlie Glotzbach took over the lead from Bobby Allison.
 Lap 94: An oil leak occurred in David Pearson's vehicle.
 Lap 98: Bobby Allison took over the lead from Charlie Glotzbach.
 Lap 137: Charlie Glotzbach took over the lead from Bobby Allison.
 Lap 160: Bobby Isaac's radiator acted strangely.
 Lap 175: Bobby Allison took over the lead from Charlie Glotzbach.
 Lap 195: Charlie Glotzbach took over the lead from Bobby Allison.
 Lap 211: Raymond Williams' engine stopped working.
 Lap 227: Bobby Allison took over the lead from Charlie Glotzbach.
 Lap 234: Charlie Glotzbach had a terminal crash.
 Lap 330: Richard D. Brown had a terminal crash.
 Finish: Bobby Allison was officially declared the winner of the event.

References

World 600
World 600
NASCAR races at Charlotte Motor Speedway